The All New Popeye Hour is an American animated television series produced by Hanna-Barbera Productions and King Features Entertainment. Starring the comic strip character Popeye, the series aired from 1978 to 1983 Saturday mornings on CBS. Despite the series' mixed reception, (mostly being criticized about its cheap animation, writing and PSAs), it was a hit for King Features Entertainment.

Production 
The show was produced by the legendary Hanna-Barbera Productions, which tried to retain the style of the original Thimble Theatre comic strip while complying with the prevailing content restrictions on violence. Featured characters, aside from the popular main stars of Popeye, Bluto, Olive Oyl and Wimpy, were Swee'Pea, Poopdeck Pappy, Eugene the Jeep and Popeye's quadruplet nephews. Popeye's outfit reverted to his original blue sailor's uniform, except for his white hat, which retained the "Dixie cup" style. Bluto's name was restored, as it had erroneously been changed to "Brutus" for the early 1960s Popeye cartoons. Olive Oyl also reverted to her 1930s look. Unlike most other cartoon series produced by Hanna-Barbera in the 1970s, The All New Popeye Hour did not contain a laugh track.

At the start, The All New Popeye Hour had three segments: "Popeye", "Popeye's Treasure Hunt" and "Dinky Dog", a non-Popeye segment about the misadventures of an enormous sheepdog that was later spun off into its own show. In 1979, the show added "The Popeye Sports Parade".

Because of restrictions on violence on television cartoons for children at the time, Popeye did not throw punches in retaliation to Bluto; he often lifted him, with his own hands or with machinery, and hurled him away. The series marked the last time Jack Mercer would voice Popeye; he died on December 4, 1984, fifteen months after the show's cancellation. Unlike most other cartoon series produced by Hanna-Barbera in the 1970s, The All New Popeye Hour did not contain a laugh track.

Each episode also contains a PSA interstitial called a Safety Tip or a Health Tip about things that include but are not limited to washing hands before dinner, brushing teeth, nutrition, crossing the street the right way, protection against sunburn, and spray paint safety. Some Safety Tips feature an anthropomorphic wolf named Mr. No-No who would engage in dangerous or destructive activities like consuming toxic substances, drinking alcohol, and smoking. He would tend to get Pipeye, Peepeye, Poopeye, and Pupeye to do the same until he is either stopped in some way or turned away by Popeye.

During the time the series was in production, CBS aired the half-hour special The Popeye Valentine Special: Sweethearts at Sea on February 14, 1979. 

The All New Popeye Hour ran on CBS until September 1981, when it was shortened to a half-hour show and retitled The Popeye and Olive Comedy Show. The show added two new segments. The first segment was "Prehistoric Popeye", which is similar to The Flintstones. The second segment was "Private Olive Oyl", where Olive and Alice the Goon join the Army, then proceed to drive their drill instructor, Sgt. Bertha Blast (voiced by Jo Anne Worley) nuts, yet impress the base commander, Col. Crumb (voiced by Hal Smith). This cartoon is based on the idea of Private Benjamin; Hanna-Barbera was also concurrently producing a virtually identical concept with sitcom characters Laverne and Shirley called Laverne and Shirley in the Army for rival network ABC at the time.

The show was removed from the CBS lineup in September 1983, and the cartoons were immediately sold to local stations in nationwide syndication. They have also been released on VHS and DVD. The syndicated version can currently be seen on Amazon Prime Video, Tubi (as "Popeye: The Continuing Adventures") and on YouTube (as "All-New Popeye").

Voice cast 
In addition to providing many of the cartoon scripts, Jack Mercer reprised his voice as Popeye, while Marilyn Schreffler and Allan Melvin became the new voices of Olive Oyl and Bluto, respectively (Mae Questel auditioned for Hanna-Barbera to recreate Olive Oyl, but was rejected in favor of Schreffler).

Main 

 Jack Mercer as Popeye, Poopdeck Pappy, Pipeye, Peepeye
 Allan Melvin as Bluto
 Marilyn Schreffler as Olive Oyl, The Sea Hag, Swee'Pea, Alice the Goon, Poopeye, Pupeye
 Julie Bennett as Monica
 Daws Butler as Wimpy
 Jackie Joseph as Sandy
 Don Messick as Eugene the Jeep
 Frank Nelson as Uncle Dudley
 Hal Smith as Col. Crumb
 John Stephenson as Mr. No No
 Frank Welker as Dinky
 Jo Anne Worley as Sgt. Bertha Blast

Additional 
 Roger Behr
 Ted Cassidy
 Richard Erdman
 Joan Gerber
 Ross Martin
 Virginia McSwain
 Pat Parris
 Barney Phillips
 Jane Roberts
 William Schallert
 Jean Vander Pyl
 Janet Waldo
 Lennie Weinrib

Episodes

Seasons 1–3 (1978–1980): The All New Popeye Hour

Season 1 (1978)

Season 2 (1979)

Season 3 (1980)

Season 4 (1981–1983): The Popeye and Olive Comedy Show

Special

Home media 
The first DVD that features The All New Popeye Hour was released on May 16, 2000, by Rhino Home Video with eighteen segments from the series. A few years later, Warner Home Video released Popeye & Friends - Volume One, a single DVD featuring eight unedited episodes.

Notes

References

External links 
 
 The All-New Popeye Hour DVD news: Final Box Art for Dinky Dog - The Complete Series
  episode listing in the Animation page on Hearst Entertainment's site

1978 American television series debuts
1983 American television series endings
1970s American animated television series
1980s American animated television series
American children's animated comedy television series
Animated television series reboots
CBS original programming
English-language television shows
Popeye the Sailor television series
Television about Bigfoot
Television series by Hanna-Barbera